Pteridocalyx is a genus of flowering plants belonging to the family Rubiaceae.

Its native range is Guyana.

Species:
 Pteridocalyx appunii Wernham

References

Rubiaceae
Rubiaceae genera